Damien Lahaye (born 30 January 1984) is a Belgian footballer who plays as a goalkeeper for Pont-à-Celles-Buzet. Lahaye has appeared in six Belgian First Division matches for Charleroi.

Career
After almost one and a half year without club, Lahaye joined RFC Rapid Symphorinois in January 2018. In February 2019, he joined R.U.S. Rebecquoise.

References

External links
Damien Lahaye at Footballdatabase

Living people
Association football goalkeepers
Belgian footballers
R. Charleroi S.C. players
Belgian Pro League players
1984 births
R.U.S. Rebecquoise players
People from Chimay
Footballers from Hainaut (province)